Kate Brasher is an American drama television series created by Stephen Tolkin, that was broadcast on CBS from February 24 until April 14, 2001. It premiered at 9:00pm ET/PT on Saturday, February 24, 2001 and was cancelled after six episodes.

Overview
The title character was the single mother of teenaged sons Daniel and Elvis. Facing a financial crisis, she seeks legal advice at Brothers Keepers, an inner city community advocacy center, and is offered a job as a social worker. Her co-workers include attorney Abbie Schaeffer and Joe Almeida, the organization's street-smart director, who founded it after his daughter was killed in gang crossfire.

Cast
 Mary Stuart Masterson as Kate Brasher 
 Rhea Perlman as Abbie Schaeffer
 Hector Elizondo as Joe Almeida 
 Mason Gamble as Elvis Brasher 
 Gregory Smith as Daniel Brasher 
 Roger Robinson as Earl

Among those actors making guest appearances during the series' short run were K Callan, Dennis Christopher, Paul Dooley, Mariette Hartley, Josh Hopkins, Carl Lumbly, Spencer Breslin, David Naughton and Mackenzie Phillips.

Development and production
Series creator Stephen Tolkin based the character of Almeida on Rabbi Mark Borovitz, an ex-convict and alcoholic who became the spiritual leader of Gateways Beit T'Shuvah, a residential treatment center for Jews in recovery from alcohol and drug addiction. The two men met when Tolkin contacted the rabbi for help with a friend who was dealing with substance abuse.

Although set in Santa Monica, California, the series was shot on location in San Diego, California.

Episodes

Critical reception
Anita Gates of the New York Times said the series "has an appealing cast and doesn't insult viewers' intelligence most of the time. But the main characters - who are 100 percent good and face off against people who are 100 percent bad - always seem to be making self-righteous speeches . . . There's nothing wrong with inspiring little speeches that make audiences cheer. It was always a pleasure to see Dixie Carter get carried away with one of hers on Designing Women. But the speeches have to say something in a fresh way, and even Ms. Carter's orations got old once the show's writers became so self-conscious about them.

Kate Brasher is trying too hard . . . to be quirky . . . to create a noisy ER-ish atmosphere of hustle, bustle, chaos and crisis, . . . [and] to be simultaneously uplifting and cynical."

References

External links
 
 

CBS original programming
2000s American drama television series
2001 American television series debuts
2001 American television series endings
Television series by 20th Century Fox Television
Television series by CBS Studios
Television shows set in California